Siamese Friends is the tenth solo album by singer/songwriter Ian Matthews. The album was recorded at Chipping Norton Recording Studios in Oxfordshire, with some overdubs added at Maison Rouge in Fulham.

The original vinyl album was released in 1979 on the Rockburgh Records label in the UK (ROC 107), various labels across Europe, and on Mushroom Records (MRS-5014) in the US and Canada. Siamese Friends was reissued on CD by Line Records in Germany in 1987 and a remastered version was issued by BGO records in 2005 as a 2-on-1 remaster coupled with Stealin' Home.

Track listing
"You Don't See Me"  (Ian Matthews/Mark Griffiths/Bob Metzger) - 4:04
"Survival"  (Marc Jordan) - 3:23
"Heatwave"  (Ian Matthews/Mark Griffiths) - 4:22
"Home Somewhere"  (Jules Shear) - 3:36
"Crying In The Night"  (Stevie Nicks) - 3:34
"The Baby She's On The Street"  (Jona Lewie) - 3:37
"Hearts On The Line"  (Ian Matthews/Judith Caldwell/Mark Griffiths) - 4:14
"Anna"  (John Martyn) - 3:27
"Lies"  (Ian Matthews/Mark Griffiths) - 3:33
"Runaway"  (Ian Matthews) - 3:34

Personnel
Ian Matthews - Vocals, acoustic guitar
Mark Griffiths - 4-string and fretless bass, electric guitar, backing vocals
Bob Metzger - Electric and acoustic guitars
Jim Russell - Drums
Mick Weaver - Acoustic grand piano, clavinet, Fender Rhodes, Wurlitzer and Yamaha CS80
Craig Buhler - Tenor and alto saxophones
Wynder K Frogg - Hammond organ
Mel Collins - Soprano and alto saxophones on "Anna", "Home Somewhere" and "Survival"
Joel Tepp - Slide guitar on "The Baby She's On The Street" and "Anna"
Simon Morton - Percussion

Production
Produced by Sandy Roberton
Recording: Chipping Norton Studios; recording engineer Barry Hammond 
Overdubs: Maison Rouge, Fulham; recording engineer Tony Taverner
Front and back cover photos: Brian D McLaughlin
Inside photos: Keith Morris
Album design: Chris Moore
Album title: Jeffrey Comanor

1979 albums